The Petrified Dunes are a series of rock formations located in Arches National Park in southeastern Utah, United States.  The dunes can be found just off of the park road between the Courthouse Towers and the Windows Area. The formation was produced when ancient sand dunes hardened into stone under the overlying subsequent material, which later eroded away.

References

External links

Landforms of Grand County, Utah
Arches National Park
Rock formations of Utah